The Oread Limestone is a geologic unit of formation rank within the Shawnee Group throughout much of its extent. It is exposed in Kansas, Nebraska, Missouri, Oklahoma, and Iowa. The type locality is Mount Oread within Lawrence, Kansas. It preserves fossils of the Carboniferous period. Although it has significant shale members, its limestone members are resistant and form escarpments and ridges. Limestone from the unit is a historic building material in Kansas, particularly in the early buildings of the University of Kansas; standing examples include Spooner Hall and Dyche Hall.

See also

 List of fossiliferous stratigraphic units in Iowa
 List of fossiliferous stratigraphic units in Kansas
 List of fossiliferous stratigraphic units in Nebraska
 Paleontology in Iowa
 Paleontology in Kansas
 Paleontology in Nebraska

References

Carboniferous Iowa
Carboniferous Kansas
Carboniferous geology of Nebraska
Carboniferous geology of Oklahoma
Carboniferous southern paleotropical deposits